Thallium(I) carbonate is the inorganic compound with the formula Tl2CO3. It is a white, water-soluble salt.  It has no or very few commercial applications.  It is produced by treatment of thallous hydroxide with CO2.

Safety
Like other thallium compounds, it is extremely toxic, with an oral median lethal dose of 21 mg/kg in mice. Due to its toxicity, it is listed in the United States List of Extremely Hazardous Substances as of 2007.

References

Carbonates
Thallium(I) compounds